Terrence Howard Evans (June 21, 1934 – August 7, 2015) was an American film and stage actor. His parents met on the  while coming to America from Britain in 1929.

Career
Between 1957 and 1965, Evans worked on stages all over the United States performing in repertory theatre. In 1965, he first came to Los Angeles to appear in the television series Gunsmoke. Since then he has appeared in numerous television and movie roles.

Evans appeared in both Star Trek: Deep Space Nine and Star Trek: Voyager. His first appearance in Deep Space Nine was in the first-season episode "Progress", in which he played the mute farmhand Baltrim. Later he appeared in the episode "Cardassians" as Proka Migdal, the adoptive father of a Cardassian boy.

In 1991, Evans appeared in Terminator 2: Judgment Day in the role of the driver of the tanker that is killed by the T-1000. In 1997, Evans played Ambassador Treen in the Voyager episode "Nemesis". He also played Leatherface's uncle Old Monty from 2003 remake of The Texas Chainsaw Massacre as well as its prequel, The Texas Chainsaw Massacre: The Beginning.
His last role was as Uncle Edgar in the 2015 released Indie Comedy Horror film Bigfoot the Movie.

Personal life
Evans had two daughters, Willow Lynne Evans and Michelle Evans Greene, with his first wife Paulette Rochelle-Levy. His second marriage was to Heidi Rorick Evans. He had one grandson, Zachary Mcmillan.

Death
Evans died on August 7, 2015, in Burbank, California.

Filmography

References

External links
 
 Terrence Evans (Aveleyman)

1934 births
2015 deaths
American male film actors
20th-century American male actors
21st-century American male actors
American male television actors
Male actors from Los Angeles